The overall quota for the figure skating competition is 148 total skaters, consisting of 74 men and 74 ladies. There will be 30 skaters in each of the single skating disciplines (men's and ladies'), 20 pair skating teams, and 24 ice dance teams. The maximum number of entries that can be qualified by a National Olympic Committee is 3 per event, making 18 (9 men, 9 ladies) the maximum number of entries that a country can qualify.

Qualification system

Skater eligibility
Skaters must be older than fifteen as of July 1, 2009 and must be a citizen of the country they represent to be eligible for the Olympic Games. Unlike qualification rules for International Skating Union events, in the case of a pair or ice dance team, both skaters must be citizens of the country they represent in competition. In addition, International Olympic Committee rules require that at least three years have passed since the competitor last represented another country in competition.

Skater qualification
There is no individual athlete qualification to the Olympics; the choice of which athlete(s) to send to the Games is at the discretion of each country's National Olympic Committee.

Country qualification
The number of entries for the figure skating events at the Olympic Games is limited by a quota set by the International Olympic Committee. There will be 30 skaters in the disciplines of men's and ladies' singles, 20 pair skating teams, and 24 ice dance teams.

Countries may qualify entries to the 2010 Winter Olympics in two ways. The host country was entitled to one entry per discipline if it failed to qualify.

The majority of the country qualification occurred at the 2009 World Figure Skating Championships. At the World Championships, countries qualified up to three entries in each discipline. The number of multiple entries is the same as usual for the World Championships and countries who earn multiple spots to the Olympics also earned multiple spots to the 2010 World Figure Skating Championships.

Every discipline qualifies separately.

The multiple spots qualification to the Olympics from the World Championships is as follows:

The results of the 2009 World Championships determined 83 total spots: 24 entries in each singles discipline, 16 in pairs, and 19 in ice dance. The available spots were awarded going down the results list, with the multiple spots being awarded first.

The remainder of the spots were filled at the 2009 Nebelhorn Trophy, held between September 23 and September 26, 2009. Countries which had already earned an entry to the Olympics were not allowed to qualify more entries at this final qualifying competition. Unlike at the World Championships, where countries could qualify more than one spot depending on the placement of the skater, at the Nebelhorn Trophy, countries who qualified were allotted only one spot to the Olympics, regardless of placement.

If a country declined to use one or more of its qualified spots, the vacated spot was awarded using the results of the Nebelhorn Trophy in descending order of placement.

Qualified countries

Men's singles

Ladies' singles

† Israel declined their spot, which was allocated to Australia. Georgia declined their second spot before the Nebelhorn Trophy, which was allocated to Uzbekistan.

Pair skating

Ice dance

Lithuania had qualified an entry in ice dance, but were forced to pull out due to Katherine Copely not being granted Lithuanian citizenship.

Declined entries
 Before the Nebelhorn Trophy, Georgia informed the ISU that it would not be using its second entry. Therefore, seven countries qualified in the ladies discipline at that competition.
 The Olympic Committee of Israel decided on January 24, 2010, not to send a skater in the ladies event.

References

 Qualification System
 Results - Pair Skating

Figure skating at the 2010 Winter Olympics
Qualification for the 2010 Winter Olympics